Grand Gulf is a ghost town in Claiborne County, Mississippi, United States.

History
Grand Gulf was named for the large whirlpool, (or gulf), formed by the Mississippi River flowing against a large rocky bluff. La Salle and Zadok Cramer commented on the dangers caused by the eddies at Grand Gulf. The British and Spanish created settlements in the area and it continued to grow after the land became part of the United States. The community of Grand Gulf was incorporated in 1833. 

Cotton from Copiah, Hinds, and Claiborne counties was shipped on the Mississippi River from Grand Gulf, and the town served as the shipping point for Port Gibson, which was located further inland. By 1835, Grand Gulf handled more cotton than any other city in Mississippi except Natchez and Vicksburg. A railroad was built to connect Grand Gulf to Port Gibson. 

By 1854, Grand Gulf was home to almost 1,000 citizens, had two churches, a town hall, a hospital, theater, cotton press, saw mill, and grist mill.

Grand Gulf was devastated by multiple yellow fever epidemics, which were reported across the country at Pittsfield, Massachusetts. The epidemics traveled with passengers and workers on the riverboats, repeatedly recurring through the nineteenth century.

A newspaper, The Grand Gulf Advertiser, was published in Grand Gulf.

A post office operated under the name Grand Gulf for more than 100 years, from 1829 to 1932.

Civil War

During the American Civil War, Grand Gulf was the site of multiple encounters. In 1862, Admiral David Farragut attempted to take a fleet of Union gunboats past Grand Gulf to attack Vicksburg. He was harassed by guerillas shooting from Grand Gulf, which caused General Thomas Williams to attempt to burn the town. Local residents convinced him that the gunfire did not come from citizens and the town was spared. A few weeks later, the town was burned by Union forces. 

During Ulysses S. Grant's Vicksburg Campaign, Confederate forces repelled his invasion fleet during the Battle of Grand Gulf. They did not let his forces pass north on the Mississippi River. Grant took his forces south to Bruinsburg, fought the Battle of Port Gibson, and marched overland to take Vicksburg.

Decline
After the Civil War, Grand Gulf's population continued to decline. The Mississippi River slowly shifted westward and the town soon became landlocked. By 1900, Grand Gulf had a population of 150.

Today
The Grand Gulf Military State Park contains a museum with artifacts from the battle and multiple interpretive exhibits, along with the earth works from Forts Wade and Cobun.

Grand Gulf is the location of the Grand Gulf Nuclear Station. After an upgrade in 2012, it is the largest single-unit nuclear power plant in the country and fifth largest in the world.

The Grand Gulf Mound, an Early Marksville culture archaeological site, is located near Grand Gulf.

Notable residents
Ephraim G. Peyton, judge

References

Former populated places in Claiborne County, Mississippi
Former populated places in Mississippi
Mississippi populated places on the Mississippi River
Mississippi in the American Civil War